Mount Armstrong is a mountain located on the Canadian provincial boundary between Alberta and British Columbia on the Continental Divide. It was named in 1918 after John Douglas Armstrong, a lieutenant with the Canadian Engineers who was killed in action on April 9, 1917, at Vimy Ridge World War I.

See also
List of peaks on the Alberta–British Columbia border
Mountains of Alberta
Mountains of British Columbia

References

External links
 Mount Armstrong: Weather forecast

Two-thousanders of Alberta
Two-thousanders of British Columbia
Canadian Rockies